Platystethus is a genus of spiny-legged rove beetles in the family Staphylinidae. There are about 6 described species in Platystethus.

Species
 Platystethus americanus Erichson, 1840
 Platystethus archetypus Scudder, 1900
 Platystethus arenarius (Geoffroy, 1785)
 Platystethus carcareus Scudder, 1900
 Platystethus degener Mulsant & Rey, 1878
 Platystethus spiculus Erichson, 1840

References

Further reading

 
 
 
 
 
 
 

Oxytelinae